Luis Diéguez (born 3 October 1966) is a Spanish diver. He competed in the men's 10 metre platform event at the 1984 Summer Olympics.

References

1966 births
Living people
Spanish male divers
Olympic divers of Spain
Divers at the 1984 Summer Olympics
Divers from Madrid